Cyrtotyphlus is a genus of rove beetles in the subfamily Leptotyphlinae.

 Names brought into synonymy
 Cyrtotyphlus apulus is a synonym for Neocyrtotyphlus apulus

References

External links 
 

 Cyrtotyphlus at insectoid.info

Leptotyphlinae
Staphylinidae genera